Green Method -Midori no Chuuyou Chitsuyo Kei- (Green Method-緑の中庸秩序系-), also known as Quantum Mechanics Rainbow IV: Green Method, is the ninth solo album from Japanese musician Daisuke Asakura released on September 15, 2004.

The album is the fourth in the Quantum Mechanics Rainbow series. The concept of this series is "one album for every rainbow color and a different Quantum Mechanics term".

Track listing

All songs produced, composed and arranged by Daisuke Asakura. Guest rap on track 5 by HIDE (Dt.).

References
 Official Daisuke Asakura Profile
 Daisuke Asakura Discography on Sony Music Japan

2004 albums
Daisuke Asakura albums